Emmanuel Longelo Mbule (born 27 December 2000) is an English professional footballer who plays as a left back for EFL Championship club Birmingham City. Longelo began his career with West Ham United and played first-team football in the EFL Cup and the Europa League before joining Birmingham City, initially on loan, in 2022.

Club career
Longelo started playing Sunday league football as a nine-year old for Euro Dagenham. He joined West Ham United's under-10 side playing as a midfielder and scored five goals on his debut, against Chelsea. Due to his pace he was moved to play as a striker. Playing for West Ham's under-23 team, Longelo played as a left-back. On 21 September 2020, Longelo made his debut for West Ham in a 5–1 EFL Cup win against Hull City.

He joined Birmingham City on a season-long loan on 30 August 2022. After recovering from injuries suffered earlier in the season, he made his debut on 1 October, starting at left wing-back in a 1–1 draw away to Championship leaders Sheffield United. In a 2–0 win over Queens Park Rangers on 28 October, he "received the ball on the left, twisted and turned past Ethan Laird and then found the bottom-right corner with a low curling finish" to score his first senior goal, and later gave away a penalty which was saved by John Ruddy.

Longelo signed a three-and-a-half-year coontract with Birmingham City on 31 January 2023. The fee, officially undisclosed, was reported by football.london as £400,000.

Personal life
Longelo was born in Barking, London, and is of Congolese descent. His older brother, Rosaire, played alongside him at West Ham before joining Newcastle United.

Career statistics

References

2000 births
Living people
People from Barking, London
English footballers
Association football defenders
West Ham United F.C. players
Birmingham City F.C. players
English Football League players
English sportspeople of Democratic Republic of the Congo descent
Black British sportspeople